Tumsar Road Junction railway station (station code:- TMR) serves Tumsar City  and the surrounding area in Bhandara district in Maharashtra, India. The station consists of five platforms. The platforms are not well sheltered. It lacks many facilities including water and sanitation.

The Tumsar Town is another railway station is located on Tirodi line.

Trains 

 Tirodi–Tumar Road DEMU
 Maharashtra Express
 Shalimar Express
 Solapur–Gondia Maharashtra Express Slip
 Shivnath Express
 Chhattisgarh Express
 Gevra Road–Nagpur Shivnath Express
 Itwari–Gondia MEMU
 Itwari–Tirodi Passenger
 Itwari–Tatanagar Passenger
 Itwari–Raipur Passenger
 Tirodi–Tumar Road Passenger
 Gondia–Tumar Road Passenger
 Tirunelveli–Bilaspur Express
 Raigarh–H.Nizamuddin Gondwana Express
 Samata Express
 Vidarbha Express
 Azad Hind Express
 Howrah–Ahmedabad Superfast Express
 Howrah Mumbai Mail (via Nagpur)
 Korba Express
 Bilaspur–Nagpur Intercity Express

Electrification
The entire main line is electrified. The Gondia–Bhandara Road section was electrified in 1990–91. and Tumsar Road station is located between Bhandara Road–Gondia section of electrification.

References

Bhandara district
Railway stations in Bhandara district
Nagpur SEC railway division